The 9th Golden Globe Awards, honoring the best in film for 1951 films, were held on February 21, 1952, at the Ciro's nightclub located in West Hollywood, California, at 8433 Sunset Boulevard, on the Sunset Strip.

Winner and Nominees

Best Picture — Drama
 A Place in the Sun
Bright Victory
Detective Story
Quo Vadis
A Streetcar Named Desire

Best Picture — Comedy or Musical
 An American in Paris

Best Performance by an Actor in a Motion Picture — Drama
 Fredric March – Death of a Salesman
Arthur Kennedy – Bright Victory
Kirk Douglas – Detective Story

Best Performance by an Actress in a Motion Picture — Drama
 Jane Wyman – The Blue Veil
Shelley Winters – A Place in the Sun
Vivien Leigh – A Streetcar Named Desire

Best Performance by an Actor in a Motion Picture — Comedy or Musical
 Danny Kaye – On the Riviera
Bing Crosby – Here Comes the Groom
Gene Kelly – An American in Paris

Best Performance by an Actress in a Motion Picture — Comedy or Musical
 June Allyson – Too Young to Kiss

Best Performance by an Actor in a Supporting Role in a Motion Picture
 Peter Ustinov – Quo Vadis

Best Performance by an Actress in a Supporting Role in a Motion Picture
 Kim Hunter – A Streetcar Named Desire
Thelma Ritter – The Mating Season
Lee Grant – Detective Story

Best Director — Motion Picture
 László Benedek – Death of a Salesman
Vincente Minnelli – An American in Paris
George Stevens – A Place in the Sun

Best Screenplay — Motion Picture
 Bright Victory – Robert Buckner

Best Music, Original Score — Motion Picture
 September Affair – composed by Victor Young 
The Well – composed by Dimitri Tiomkin
The Day the Earth Stood Still – Bernard Herrmann

Cinematography — Black and White
 Death of a Salesman – Franz F. Planer 
Decision Before Dawn – Franz F. Planer
A Place in the Sun – William C. Mellor

Cinematography — Color
 Quo Vadis – photographed by William V. Skall

Promoting International Understanding
 The Day the Earth Stood Still – Robert Wise

Special Achievement Award
Alain Resnais

Henrietta Award (World Film Favorites)
 Esther Williams

New Star of the Year Actor
Kevin McCarthy

New Star of the Year Actress
Pier Angeli

References

009
1951 film awards
1951 television awards
Golden Globe
February 1952 events in the United States